Ion Ionuț Luțu (born 3 August 1975) is a Romanian former professional footballer who played as a midfielder. He was compared to Gheorghe Hagi, being nicknamed "the Little Hagi" or "Hagi-Luțu". He was known for his fine dribbling and technique, as well as spectacular finishing, but also for his inconsistency.

International career
Ionuț Luțu played his only game for Romania on 3 March 1999 when coach Victor Pițurcă introduced him in the 61st minute to replace Laurențiu Roșu in a friendly which ended with a 2–0 victory against Estonia.

Honours
Galatasaray
Turkish First League: 1997–98
Steaua București
Cupa României: 1998–99
Suwon Samsung Bluewings
AFC Champions League: 2000–01, 2001–02
Asian Super Cup: 2002
Korean FA Cup: 2002
Korean Super Cup: 2000
Korean League Cup: 2000, 2001
Rapid București
Romanian Supercup: 2003
Alro Slatina
Liga III: 2009–10

References

External links
 
 
 
 Detailed interview

1975 births
Living people
Sportspeople from Slatina, Romania
Association football midfielders
Romanian footballers
Romanian expatriate footballers
Romania international footballers
Romania youth international footballers
Romania under-21 international footballers
FC Progresul București players
FC U Craiova 1948 players
Galatasaray S.K. footballers
FC Steaua București players
Suwon Samsung Bluewings players
FC Rapid București players
Apollon Limassol FC players
FC Kairat players
CSM Jiul Petroșani players
CS Pandurii Târgu Jiu players
Liga I players
Liga II players
Liga III players
Süper Lig players
K League 1 players
Kazakhstan Premier League players
Cypriot First Division players
Expatriate footballers in Turkey
Expatriate footballers in South Korea
Expatriate footballers in Cyprus
Expatriate footballers in Kazakhstan
Romanian expatriate sportspeople in Turkey
Romanian expatriate sportspeople in Kazakhstan
Romanian expatriate sportspeople in South Korea
Romanian expatriate sportspeople in Cyprus